Bliznino is a rural locality (a village) in Klyazminskoye Rural Settlement, Kovrovsky District, Vladimir Oblast, Russia. The population was 18 as of 2010.

Geography 
Bliznino is located 20 km northeast of Kovrov (the district's administrative centre) by road. Baberikha is the nearest rural locality.

References 

Rural localities in Kovrovsky District